The National Research Institute for Chemical Technology (NARICT) is a parastatal under Nigeria Federal Ministry of Science and Technology.  It is located in Basawa, Zaria, Kaduna State.

Research Departments 
The institute presently has four research departments involved in renewable energy research, catalysis, and treatment of industrial effluent waste.  

The departments are : 
 Basic Research
 Petrochemical and Allied
 Industrial and Environmental Technology Department
 Textile Technology Department.

Analytical equipment and laboratories 
NARICT's laboratories contain analytical equipment such as GCMS, AAS, LCMS, BET surface area analyzer, DTGA, SEM, FTIR and HPLC to name a few.

Leadership 
The Current Director General/CEO of the institute is Professor Jeff Barminas. Formally resuming office on 27 May 2017.

References 

Research institutes in Nigeria
Science and technology in Nigeria